Farman Fatehpuri (born Syed Dildar Ali, 26 January 1926 – 3 August 2013) was an Urdu linguist, researcher, writer, critic and scholar of Pakistan.

He is widely regarded as a leading authority on the  life and work of Ghalib. He wrote many scholarly articles, book reviews, and editorials. He received Sitara-e-Imtiaz Award for his literary accomplishments in 1985 from the President of Pakistan.

Biography 
Fatehpuri was born on 26 January 1926 in the Fatehpur, Uttar Pradesh, India. His father died in 1933 while he was still a child. He received his matriculation from Fatehpur and intermediate education (high school) from Allahabad in 1948. He graduated from Agra University in 1950. Farman migrated to Pakistan in 1950 and settled in Karachi. He completed his Master of Arts, LLB and B.T. from Karachi University. In 1965, he obtained his  PhD degree. He also received a D.Litt (Doctor of Letters) degree in Urdu in 1974. He remained associated with Karachi University for nearly 30 years and taught many PhD students and researchers. He was later appointed chief editor and secretary of the Urdu Dictionary Board in 1985. In the same year, he was awarded the Sitara-i-Imtiaz medal (Star of Excellence) by the President of Pakistan.

From 1996 on, he served as a member of the Civil Services Board of the Sindh Government. He became the editor of the monthly publication, Nigar – the oldest Urdu literary journal, founded by Farman's mentor, Allama Niaz Fatehpuri.

Death 

He  died on 3 August 2013 (24th Ramadan). His final rites were offered on 4 August 2013, and he was buried in the Karachi University graveyard.

Literary works 
Farman's works and ideas have had a strong influence on researchers investigating the poetry and prose of Ghalib and Urdu linguistics. He was the author of more than 60 titles on the Urdu poetry of Ghalib and Allama Iqbal, including linguistics, critique, and biography.

Bibliography
 Urdu Rubai
 Tadrees-e-Urdu
 Urdu ki Manzoom Dastaan
 Tehqeeq-o-Tanqeed
 Naya aur Purana Adab
 Nawab Mirza Shauq ki Masnavian
 Qamar Zamani Begum
 Zaban aur Urdu Zaban
 Urdu Imla aur Rasmulkhat
 Urdu ki Naatia Shaeeri
 Taweel-o-Tadbeer
 Iqbal sab kay leay
 Fun-e-Taarikh goi
 Urdu Shura kay Tazkaray aur Tazkara Nigari
 Mir Anees – Hayat aur Shaeeri
 Irghaman-e-Gokal Parshad
 Ghalib – Shaer-e-Imroz-o-Farda
 Darya-e-Ishq aur Behr-ul-Mohabbat ka Taqabuli Mutaalea
 Urdu Afsana aur Afsana Nigari
 Hindi-Urdu Tanazea
 Niaz Fatehpuri – Deeda Shuneeda
 Aurat aur Funoon Latifa
 Ghazaleyat-e-Ghalib – Sharah-o-Matan
 Bila Jawaz (biography)
 Urdu Shaeeri aur Pakistani Maashra Urdu Fiction Ki Mukhtasar Tareekh''

Awards and recognition
Sitara-i-Imtiaz (Star of Excellence) award by the President of Pakistan in 1985.

See also
 List of Pakistani writers
 List of Urdu language writers

References

External links
 BOOK LAUNCHING CEREMONY
 Urdu experts have the last word - The Express Tribune newspaper
 Farman Fatehpuri on Urdu Bandhan
 Website: drfarmanfatehpuri.com

1926 births
2013 deaths
Academic staff of the University of Karachi
Linguists from Pakistan
Pakistani lexicographers
Urdu-language non-fiction writers
Pakistani literary critics
University of Karachi alumni
Linguists of Urdu
Urdu critics
Muhajir people
People from Fatehpur, Uttar Pradesh
Writers from Karachi
Sindh Muslim Law College alumni
Recipients of Sitara-i-Imtiaz